George Schmidt (October 28, 1927 – August 29, 1995) was an American football defensive end in the National Football League. He played professionally for the Green Bay Packers and the Chicago Cardinals.

Early life and career
Schmidt was born in Chicago and attended Theodore Roosevelt High School. He played college football at Lewis University and Illinois Tech.

He first played in the NFL with the Green Bay Packers during the 1952 NFL season, joining the Packers as a free agent. The following season, he played with the Chicago Cardinals.

References

1927 births
1995 deaths
American football defensive ends
Chicago Cardinals players
Green Bay Packers players
Illinois Tech Scarlet Hawks football players
Lewis Flyers football players
People from Schaumburg, Illinois
Players of American football from Chicago